Alexis Sarah Elizabeth Gomez is an American singer, musician, and songwriter. She gained popularity as a country singer on American Idol, season 14. Alexis is a graduate of Wright State University in Dayton, Ohio. Her self titled debut album was released in August 2015 from CD Baby.

References

External links
Official website
Alexis Gomez on American Idol
Radio interview

Living people
American country singer-songwriters
Year of birth missing (living people)
Country musicians from Ohio
Singer-songwriters from Ohio